Maxim Gennadyevich Maksimov (born September 6, 1979 in Izhevsk) is a retired Russian biathlete and biathlon coach. He took two individual medals in the Biathlon World Championships, a bronze in 2008 and a silver in 2011: these were also his only podiums in the Biathlon World Cup. In 2019 he was appointed as an assistant coach to the Russian national biathlon team, having previously been a regional coach in the Yamalo-Nenets Autonomous Okrug.

References

External links 
Profile on biathlonworld.com

1979 births
Living people
Sportspeople from Izhevsk
Russian male biathletes
Biathlon World Championships medalists
Cross-country skiing coaches
Russian sports coaches
21st-century Russian people
20th-century Russian people